Escrito nas Estrelas (English: Written in the Stars) is a Brazilian telenovela produced and aired by Globo from April 12 to September 24, 2010.

Cast

International broadcasts

Soundtrack 
 "Quando a Chuva Passar" – Paula Fernandes
 "Eternamente" – Gal Costa
 "Ela Só Pensa em Beijar (Se Ela Dança, Eu Danço)" – Celso Fonseca
 "Pai" – Fábio Júnior
 "Roda Gigante II" – Marcelo Mira
 "Ela Briga Comigo" – Moinho 
 "Mamãe Passou Açúcar em Mim (ao vivo)" - Mart'nália
 "Deixa Eu Te Amar" (ao Vivo) - Diogo Nogueira
 "Para de Paradinha" – Arlindo Cruz
 "Nossa História" – Lorena Chaves
 "Erva Venenosa (Poison Ivy)" – Rita Lee
 "Coração de Papel" – Zé Renato
 "Quem Tome Conta de Mim (Someone To Watch Over Me)" – Paula Toller
 "Gente Humilde" – Luiza Possi

And also

 "Angel" - Katherine Jenkins
 "Billionaire" - Travie McCoy ft. Bruno Mars
 "Fly to the moon" - The Parlotones
 "If We Were" - Belinda
 "Someone To Watch Over Me" - Bia Son
 "Postcard" - Lu Alone
 "Can't Take My Eyes of You" - Barbara Mendes

Awards and nominations

References

External links 
  

2010 telenovelas
Brazilian telenovelas
2010 Brazilian television series debuts
2010 Brazilian television series endings
TV Globo telenovelas
Portuguese-language telenovelas
Television shows set in Rio de Janeiro (city)
Telenovelas about spiritism